Recorded in Boston at Storyville (often simply called At Storyville) is a live album by the Gerry Mulligan Quartet from performances recorded at the Storyville nightclub in late 1956 and released by Pacific Jazz.

Reception

The Allmusic review by Scott Yanow called it "A fine all-round performance from this cool-toned bop unit".

Track listing
All compositions by Gerry Mulligan except as indicated
 "Bweebida Bwobbida" - 6:38
 "The Birth of the Blues" (Ray Henderson, Lew Brown, Buddy DeSylva) - 4:36
 "Baubles, Bangles and Beads" (George Forrest, Robert Wright) - 3:27
 "Rustic Hop" (Bob Brookmeyer) - 4:50
 "Open Country" (Brookmeyer) - 5:43
 "Storyville Story" - 5:35
 "That Old Feeling" (Sammy Fain, Brown) - 4:06
 "Bike Up the Strand/Utter Chaos" - 6:20Bonus tracks on CD reissue
 "Blues at the Roots" - 4:54
 "Ide's Side" - 5:10
 "I Can't Get Started" (Vernon Duke, Ira Gershwin) - 2:42
 "Frenesi" (Alberto Domínguez) - 4:25
 "Flash" - 2:43
 "Honeysuckle Rose" (Fats Waller, Andy Razaf) - 3:19
 "Limelight/Utter Chaos" - 4:42

Personnel
Gerry Mulligan – baritone saxophone, piano
Bob Brookmeyer –  valve trombone, piano
Bill Crow – double bass
Dave Bailey – drums

References

Gerry Mulligan live albums
1957 live albums
Pacific Jazz Records live albums